The white-thighed hornbill (Bycanistes albotibialis) is a species of hornbill.
It is found in Angola, Benin, Cameroon, Central African Republic, Republic of the Congo, Democratic Republic of the Congo, Equatorial Guinea, Gabon, Nigeria, Sudan, and Uganda.  It is sometimes considered to be a subspecies of the brown-cheeked hornbill.

References

white-thighed hornbill
Birds of Central Africa
white-thighed hornbill
Taxonomy articles created by Polbot